Anderson Union High School is a high school in Anderson, California.

Notable alumni
Rick Bosetti, former Major League Baseball outfielder for four different teams
Mike Humiston, former head baseball coach for Waynesburg University, played in the NFL for Baltimore Colt, Buffalo Bills and the San Diego Chargers
Mark Parent, former Major League Baseball catcher for a number of teams from 1986 through 1998
Bill Plummer, former Major League Baseball catcher for Cincinnati Reds and Seattle Mariners
Jacob Slichter, drummer for the Minneapolis based rock band, Semisonic

References

External links 
 www.andersoncubs.com 

High schools in Shasta County, California
Educational institutions established in 1909
Public high schools in California
1909 establishments in California